Alfred Robinson (born 1888; date of death unknown) was an English professional footballer who was born in Manchester and played as a goalkeeper in the Football League for Gainsborough Trinity and Blackburn Rovers, and in non-League football for Chapel-en-le-Frith and Darwen.

Robinson, noted for his "daring and agility", began the 1911–1912 season as Blackburn Rovers' first choice goalkeeper for the team that won the 1911–12 Football League and the team that won again in 1913–14. His football career was interrupted by service in World War I after which he returned to Blackburn. He left the club for Darwen in 1923.

References

1888 births
Footballers from Manchester
Date of death unknown
English footballers
Association football goalkeepers
Gainsborough Trinity F.C. players
Blackburn Rovers F.C. players
Darwen F.C. players
English Football League players
British military personnel of World War I
Military personnel from Manchester